King Edgar's council at Chester took place in AD 973 shortly after Edgar's coronation at Bath. What happened at Chester has been heavily obscured by the embellishments and political environment of later, twelfth century chroniclers, however, it is claimed that several kings came and pledged their allegiance to Edgar, including Kenneth II of Scotland and Máel Coluim I of Strathclyde and five from Wales. The chroniclers wrote that these kings pledged their faith that they would be Edgar's liege-men on sea and land.  Later chroniclers made the kings into eight, all plying the oars of Edgar's state barge on the River Dee. Such embellishments may not be factual, and what actually happened is unclear.

Eadwulf Evil-child, the Earl of Bamburgh, Oslac, the Earl of York, and Bishop Ælfsige of Lindisfarne escorted Kenneth II to the council at Chester. Chroniclers wrote that after Kenneth had reportedly done homage, Edgar rewarded Kenneth by granting him Laudian (thought to be Lothian), thereby changing the frontier between Northumbria and Alba (this was the nascent Anglo-Scottish border) in Alba's favour.

Location

The traditional location of Edgar's royal residence in Chester is known as Edgar's Field, a park in Handbridge, a district of Chester.  The barge is thought to have been rowed from Edgar's residence up the Dee to St John's Church on the opposite bank.

Notes

Further reading

History of Chester
973
10th century in England
Anglo-Scottish border